Sim Chang-min (심창민, 沈昌珉, born February 1, 1993) is South Korean professional baseball pitcher currently playing for the Samsung Lions of the KBO League.

External links
Career statistics and player information from Korea Baseball Organization

1993 births
2015 WBSC Premier12 players
2017 World Baseball Classic players
KBO League pitchers
Kyungnam High School alumni
Living people
People from Pohang
Samsung Lions players
South Korean baseball players
Sportspeople from North Gyeongsang Province